The Throne of the Third Heaven of the Nations' Millennium General Assembly is the debut album by indie band Le Loup. It was released on September 11, 2007. It is named after the eponymous artwork by outsider artist James Hampton.

Track listing
All songs composed by Sam Simkoff except as noted.

"Canto I" (Bryan Oemler, Simkoff) – 2:38
"Planes Like Vultures." – 3:04
"Outside of This Car, the End of the World!" – 2:54
"To the Stars! To the Night!" – 3:14
"(storm)" (Christian Ervin) – 2:13
"We Are Gods! We Are Wolves!" – 3:17
"Breathing Rapture" – 2:54
"Look to the West." – 2:51
"(howl)" (Ervin, Simkoff) – 1:01
"Le Loup (Fear Not)" – 4:14
"Canto XXXVI" (Ervin, Simkoff) – 3:47
"I Had a Dream I Died." (Ervin, Simkoff) – 7:20

Personnel

Sam Simkoff – keyboard, banjo
Christian Ervin – computer
Michael Ferguson – guitar
Robert Sahm – drums
Jim Thomson – guitar

References

2007 debut albums
Le Loup albums